The following is an incomplete list of chamber music festivals, which encapsulates music festivals focused on chamber music. Chamber music is a form of classical music that is composed for a small group of instruments—traditionally a group that could fit in a palace chamber or any small chamber. Most broadly, it includes any art music that is performed by a small number of performers, with one performer to a part. From its earliest beginnings in the Medieval period to the present, chamber music has been a reflection of the changes in the technology and the society that produced it.

Related lists and categories
The following lists have some or total overlap:
List of classical music festivals
List of maritime music festivals
List of Celtic festivals

Festivals

Gallery

See also

List of music festivals
Chamber music

References

Chamber music festivals
 
Chamber